{{DISPLAYTITLE:C11H13F3N2}}
The molecular formula C11H13F3N2 (molar mass: 230.23 g/mol, exact mass: 230.1031 u) may refer to:

 Trifluoromethylphenylpiperazine
 1-(4-(Trifluoromethyl)phenyl)piperazine